
Year 657 (DCLVII) was a common year starting on Sunday (link will display the full calendar) of the Julian calendar. The denomination 657 for this year has been used since the early medieval period, when the Anno Domini calendar era became the prevalent method in Europe for naming years.

Events

By place

Europe 
 Grimoald the Elder, mayor of the palace of Austrasia, is deposed by Clovis II, king of Neustria. Clovis also captures Grimoald's son Childebert the Adopted, executing them both. 
 Clovis II dies and is succeeded by his eldest son Chlothar III, age 5, who becomes king of Neustria and Burgundy, under the regency of his mother Balthild.

Arab Empire 
 Battle of Siffin: Muslim forces under Ali ibn Abi-Talib fight an inconclusive battle against Muawiyah ibn Abu Sufyan, on the banks of the Euphrates, near Raqqa (Syria).

Asia 
 Tang campaigns against the Western Turks: Emperor Gao Zong dispatches a military campaign led by Su Dingfang. He annexes the Western Turkic Khaganate.
 Gao Zong commissions the pharmacology publication of an official materia medica, documenting the use of 833 different substances for medicinal purposes.

Americas 
 In the course of the Second Tikal-Calakmul War, the Snake Lord (Yuknoom Ch'een II) makes a direct attack against Tikal itself, driving out its new ruler Nuun Ujol Chaak, and establishing Calakmul as the regional superpower. B'alaj Chan K'awiil, the one time heir apparent to rule Tikal, swears his allegiance to the new overlord.

By topic

Religion 
 June 1 – Pope Eugene I dies at Rome after a reign of nearly 2½ years. He is succeeded by Vitalian as the 76th pope.
 Hilda, Anglo-Saxon abbess, founds a monastery at Streaneshalch, on the Yorkshire coast at Whitby (England).

Births 
 Ansprand, king of the Lombards (approximate date)

Deaths 
 June 2 – Pope Eugene I
 November 12 – Livinus, Irish apostle 
 Ammar ibn Yasir, companion of Muhammad and Ali ibn Abi Talib (b. 570)
 Childebert the Adopted, king (usurper) of Austrasia 
 Clovis II, king of Neustria and Burgundy (or 658)
 Grimoald the Elder, Mayor of the Palace (b. 616)
 Talorgan I, king of the Picts

References